Frank Leander Bacon (September 6, 1841 – December 8, 1917) was a farmer, businessman, and politician.

Born in Dayton, New York, Bacon and his wife moved to Wisconsin and settled in the Town of Waupun, Fond du Lac County, Wisconsin in 1865. Bacon owned a farm and had a milling business and a cheese and butter factory. Bacon served as chairman of the Town of Waupun and was a Republican. In 1895, Bacon served in the Wisconsin State Assembly. In 1902, Bacon retired and moved into the City of Waupun, Wisconsin where he died in 1917.

Notes

1841 births
1917 deaths
People from Cattaraugus County, New York
People from Waupun, Wisconsin
Businesspeople from Wisconsin
Farmers from Wisconsin
Mayors of places in Wisconsin
Republican Party members of the Wisconsin State Assembly
19th-century American politicians